Eupithecia ochrosoma is a moth in the  family Geometridae. It is found in Peru.

The forewings are dull dark olive cinereous, with no distinct lines or markings. The hindwings are similar.

References

Moths described in 1904
ochrosoma
Moths of South America